Ras suppressor protein 1 is a protein that in humans is encoded by the RSU1 gene.

This gene encodes a protein that is involved in the Ras signal transduction pathway, growth inhibition, and nerve-growth factor induced differentiation processes, as determined in mouse and human cell line studies. In mouse, the encoded protein was initially isolated based on its ability to inhibit v-Ras transformation. Multiple alternatively spliced transcript variants for this gene have been reported; one of these variants was found only in glioma tumors.
RSU-1 has also been seen to act as a structural protein in integrin-mediated focal-adhesion complexes. It bind strongly to the protein PINCH.

References

Further reading